Al Suwaihliya is a village in northwest Qatar located in the municipality of Al-Shahaniya.  According to the Ministry of Environment, there were about eight households in the village in 2014.

It is accessible through Al Jemailiya Road. The village of Abu Sidrah is nearby to the south.

Etymology
Al Suwaihliya's name originates from the Arabic word "sahil", which translates to coast. It earned this name from its geographic proximity to the Persian Gulf.

Gallery

References

Populated places in Al-Shahaniya